Lloyd Marshall (June 4, 1914 – August 4, 1997) was an American light heavyweight boxer who was inducted posthumously into the International Boxing Hall of Fame in June 2010.

Pro career
Marshall began his boxing career at the age of 17 and turned pro in 1936.  In 1943 Marshall fought for the "Duration" Light Heavyweight Title against Jimmy Bivins.  During the bout, Bivins was knocked down in the 7th for a 2-count, and then Marshall was down for nine in the 9th, and at the bell in the 12th.  Marshall was then counted out in the 13th to lose the bout.  In 1944 he captured the Vacant "Duration" World Light Heavyweight Title with a victory over Nate Bolden.  Due to the fact that he fought at his peak during World War II, Marshall never fought for an officially recognized world title.
He retired in 1951 after KO losses to Bobo Olson and then Harry Matthews.

He fought 4 fights against other black murder's row fighters: all within the 2-year period of September 1942- September 1944.

Honors

*Denotes Hall of Famer

Marshall was inducted to World Boxing Hall of Fame in 1996. He was posthumously inducted to the International Boxing Hall of Fame in June 2010.

Professional boxing record

See also
Murderers' Row (Boxing)

External links

"Who I voted for in HOF election?" - ESPN.com
Cyber Boxing Zone page

|-

References

International Boxing Hall of Fame inductees
Light-heavyweight boxers
American male boxers
1914 births
1997 deaths